Sayyidina 'Othman Secondary School ( or SMSO) is a government secondary school in Bukit Beruang, a settlement in Tutong District, Brunei. The school provides five years of general secondary education leading up to O Level qualification. As of 2018, the principal of Sayyidina 'Othman Secondary School is Vincent Andrew.

See also 
 List of secondary schools in Brunei

References 

Secondary schools in Brunei
Cambridge schools in Brunei